Billion Dollar Wreck is a History series documenting Martin Bayerle's attempt to salvage the wreck of the RMS Republic.

Cast
 Martin Bayerle
 Grant Bayerle
 Tim Ferris

Episodes

Season 1

References

External links
 
Inspired by the book The Tsar's Treasure
The Official RMS Republic Website

English-language television shows
History (American TV channel) original programming